Stabburselva is a river in Porsanger Municipality in Troms og Finnmark county, Norway.

The Stabburselva river has the reputation of being a good salmon fishing river, along with the nearby rivers Lakselva and Børselva.

References

Porsanger
Rivers of Troms og Finnmark
Rivers of Norway